Crambus sanfordellus is a moth in the family Crambidae. It was described by Alexander Barrett Klots in 1942. It is found in the US state of Florida.

The length of the forewings is about 11.6 mm. The ground color of the forewings is bright orange brown with a silvery-white discal stripe and a series of semi-metallic lines the between veins. The hindwings are light brownish, but whitish towards the anal region.

Etymology
The species is named for Mr. L. J. Sanford, one of the collectors of the species.

References

Crambini
Moths described in 1942
Moths of North America